Amy Frederica Brenneman (born June 22, 1964) is an American actress and producer. She worked extensively in television, coming to prominence as Detective Janice Licalsi in the ABC police drama series NYPD Blue (1993–1994). Brenneman next co-created and starred as Judge Amy Gray in the CBS drama series Judging Amy (1999–2005). She received five Primetime Emmy Award nominations for these roles.

In subsequent years, Brenneman has had starring roles as Violet Turner in the Shonda Rhimes medical drama series Private Practice (2007–2013), and as Laurie Garvey on the HBO drama series The Leftovers (2014–2017). She is also known for her recurring role as Faye Moskowitz on Frasier and has starred in various films, including Heat (1995), Fear (1996), Daylight (1996), Things You Can Tell Just by Looking at Her (2000), Nine Lives (2005), and The Jane Austen Book Club (2007).

Early life
Brenneman was born in New London, Connecticut, to Frederica Joanne (née Shoenfield), a judge of the Connecticut State Superior Court, and Russell Langdon Brenneman Jr., an environmental lawyer. Her aunt was Cold War-era journalist Beryl D. Hines.  Her mother was Jewish, and joined a Congregationalist church as an adult. Her father, who was of English, Irish, and Swiss descent, was from a Protestant background.

Brenneman was raised in Glastonbury, Connecticut, where she participated in theatre as a teenager, both in school at Glastonbury High School and with a local theater group. She graduated from Harvard University, where she majored in comparative religion, in 1987. While at Harvard, she co-founded Cornerstone Theatre Company, with which she traveled for several years after graduation.

Career

Brenneman began her career in the short-lived CBS series Middle Ages in 1992. The next year she was cast in her first major role as mob-connected uniformed officer Janice Licalsi on the ABC police drama series, NYPD Blue. Her story arc, which included a romantic relationship with David Caruso's character, ran through the show's first season (1993–1994) and the first few episodes of the second season. She was nominated for an Emmy Award for Best Supporting Actress in a Drama Series in 1994 and for Outstanding Guest Actress the following year.

After leaving NYPD Blue, Brenneman made her way into film. In 1995, she appeared in Bye Bye Love, Casper, and the critically acclaimed crime drama Heat. In 1996, Brenneman had the female lead role opposite Sylvester Stallone in disaster thriller Daylight, and also starred in another thriller, Fear. In 1997, she played the leading role in the independent drama film Nevada. The next year she starred in Your Friends & Neighbors directed by Neil LaBute. In 1998–1999 season, she returned to television with a recurring role on the NBC comedy, Frasier, as Faye Moskowitz.

In 1999, Brenneman became creator and executive producer of her own television series Judging Amy, in which she played the title character. Brenneman portrayed a divorced single mother working as a Family Court Judge in Hartford, Connecticut. The show's concept was based on the real-life experiences of her mother, Frederica Brenneman, as a superior court judge in the state of Connecticut. Frederica Brenneman was one of Harvard Law School's first female graduates and became a juvenile court judge in Connecticut when Amy was 3 years old. Amy has said, "I play my mother's job, not my mother." Judging Amy ran on CBS for six seasons and 138 episodes from September 19, 1999, to May 3, 2005, to good ratings. In 2002, she was awarded the Women in Film Lucy Award in recognition of her excellence and innovation in her creative works that have enhanced the perception of women through the medium of television.

Brenneman starred in ensemble cast film Things You Can Tell Just by Looking at Her directed by Rodrigo García in 2000. In 2005, she starred in another Rodrigo García's independent drama, Nine Lives. In 2007, Brenneman played the role of Sylvia Avila in The Jane Austen Book Club based on 2004 novel of the same name by Karen Joy Fowler. In 2008, Brenneman co-starred in 88 Minutes alongside Al Pacino.

In March 2007, Brenneman was cast as Violet Turner in the Grey's Anatomy spin-off, Private Practice. The Shonda Rhimes series ran on ABC from September 26, 2007, to January 22, 2013. She later starred in films The Face of Love and Words and Pictures, and was cast in HBO drama series The Leftovers opposite Justin Theroux. Also in 2013, Brenneman played the role of Mary of Guise, the series' lead character's mother, in Reign.

Personal life
In 1995, Brenneman married director Brad Silberling in the garden at her parents' home. They had originally met on the set of NYPD Blue. Brenneman and Silberling have two children, Charlotte Tucker and Bodhi Russell.

Brenneman is an Episcopalian.

Brenneman, signed the "We Had Abortions" petition which appears in the October 2006 issue of Ms. Magazine. The petition contains signatures of over 5,000 women declaring that they had an abortion and were "unashamed of the choice they made."

In the February 28, 2007, all-star benefit reading of The Gift of Peace at UCLA's Freud Playhouse, she portrays an entrepreneur, alongside actors Ed Asner, Barbara Bain, George Coe, Wendie Malick, and James Pickens, Jr. The play was an open appeal and fundraiser for passage of U.S. House Resolution 808, which sought to establish a Cabinet-level "Department of Peace" in the United States government, funded by a two percent diversion of The Pentagon's annual budget.

In July 2008, Brenneman was nominated as a candidate on the Unite for Strength slate for a place on the national governing board of the Screen Actors Guild (SAG) in elections scheduled for 18 September 2008. The bid was successful.

Brenneman is also a strong supporter of more restrictive gun laws, and in 2009 she hosted the Target for a Safe America gala at the Riviera Country Club in Los Angeles for the Brady Center to Prevent Gun Violence, a gun control group that favors restrictive gun laws and supports gun bans.

Filmography

Film

Television

Music videos

Producer

Awards and nominations

References

External links 

 Official site
 
 
 Frederica/Amy Brenneman article at Harvard Law School alumni site

1964 births
20th-century American actresses
21st-century American actresses
Actresses from Connecticut
American Episcopalians
American feminists
American film actresses
American gun control activists
American people of English descent
American people of Irish descent
American people of Jewish descent
American people of Swiss descent
American television actresses
Harvard University alumni
Living people
People from Glastonbury, Connecticut
People from New London, Connecticut